Gurankesh or Gowran Kash or Guran Kesh or Gurankosh or Guran Kosh, also rendered as Goran Kash or Kurankoch or Kurankosh or Kuran Kash, may refer to:
 Gurankesh-e Abd ol Rahman
 Gurankesh-e Jamaat
 Gurankesh-e Molla Goharam